James F. Thomas (May 6, 1917 – June 4, 1981) was an American football guard. 

Thomas was born in 1917 at Oilton, Oklahoma. He attended Oilton High School.

Thomas attended the University of Oklahoma and played for the Oklahoma Sooners football team from 1935 to 1938.  He was a member of the 1938 Oklahoma Sooners football team that compiled a 10–1 record and was ranked No. 4 in the final Associated Press poll. He was known as "Singer" Thomas at Oklahoma because of his constant singing in the shower room.

He was drafted by the Chicago Cardinals with the 102nd pick in the 1939 NFL Draft. He appeared in 13 games for the Cardinals during the 1939 and 1940 seasons. 

Thomas was also an opera singer who sang with the Metropolitan Opera for a year. He served in the Army during World War II, attaining the rank of lieutenant and serving in the field artillery under General George Patton. He was a school teacher in Florence, South Carolina, starting in 1966. He died of an apparent heart attack in 1981 in Florence.

References

1917 births
1981 deaths
Chicago Cardinals players
Oklahoma Sooners football players
Players of American football from Oklahoma
People from Creek County, Oklahoma